The 2017 Liga 1, also known as Go-Jek Traveloka Liga 1 for sponsorship reasons, was the inaugural season of Liga 1 under its current name and the eighth season of the top-flight Indonesian professional league for association football clubs since its establishment in 2008. The season started on 15 April 2017 and ended on 12 November 2017. Fixtures for the 2017 season were announced on 11 April 2017.

2014 Indonesia Super League winners Persib were the defending champions, as the 2015 Indonesia Super League was abandoned midway due to FIFA suspension while the 2016 Indonesia Soccer Championship A was not counted as an official league.

Bhayangkara won their first Liga 1 title with one match to spare.

The season was marred by the death of Persela goalkeeper Choirul Huda.

Overview

Referees

In December 2016, PSSI and the league operator planned to use foreign referees for the 2017 competition. The use of foreign referee was intended to improve the quality of the competition. However, two weeks before the league starts, this plan was cancelled.

After a wide criticism, protest and dissatisfaction towards the local referees during the first round of the season, PSSI revisited the idea. On 18 July 2017, PSSI and the league operator officially announced the use of foreign referees and assistant referees in select matches for the second round. There were two sets of officials (consisted of 1 referee and 2 assistant referees), each coming from Australia, Kyrgyzstan, Iran, and Japan.

Player regulation
League operator also introduced several new regulations, such as requiring clubs to contract a minimum of five U-23 local players with three of them having to play as starting lineup minimum of 45 minutes in a match, restricting clubs to have more than two players older than 35 years old, and increasing the maximum number of substitutions to five for each team in a match.

On 30 July 2017, in preparation for the 2017 Southeast Asian Games, all regulations concerning under-23 players were suspended. Later on 31 August 2017, PSSI decided to extend the suspension of all regulations concerning under-23 players until end of season.

Substitution rule
FIFA approved the five substitution rule on 12 April 2017. However, the two additional substitutions (in addition of three substitutions, in accordance to FIFA Laws of the Game) were only allowed for U-23 players.

Teams 
Eighteen teams competed in the league – all teams from the abandoned 2015 Indonesia Super League. As such, no promoted team competed this season.

Name changes
 Arema Cronus changed name to Arema before the start of the season.
 Pusamania Borneo changed name to Borneo before the start of the season.

Stadiums and locations

Notes:

Personnel and kits
Note: Flags indicate national team as has been defined under FIFA eligibility rules. Players and coaches may hold more than one non-FIFA nationality.

Additionally, referee kits are made by Joma and Nike supplied the match ball.

Coaching changes

Foreign players
Football Association of Indonesia or PSSI restricted the number of foreign players strictly to four per team, including one slot for a player from AFC countries, and one slot for a marquee player, a player that was required to have played in a top European league (Premier League, La Liga, Serie A, Bundesliga, Ligue 1, Primeira Liga, Eredivisie, Süper Lig, etc.) in the last 8 years, or a player that have played in the last three editions of the FIFA World Cup. Teams can use all the foreign players at once.
 Players name in bold indicates the player was registered during the mid-season transfer window.
 Former Player(s) were players that out of squad or left club within the season, after pre-season transfer window, or in the mid-season transfer window, and at least had one appearance.

Source: First transfer window, Second transfer window

Notes:

League table

Results

Season statistics

Top goalscorers

Hat-tricks

Discipline
 Most yellow card(s): 12
  Jorge Gotor (Mitra Kukar)
 Most red card(s): 3
  Sandi Sute (Persija)

Attendances

Awards
These were the list of Liga Indonesia First & Excellence (LIFE) Awards 2017 winners that held on 22 December 2017.

See also
 2017 Liga 2
 2017 Liga 3

References

Works cited

External links 
 

 
Liga 1 seasons
Liga 1
1
Indonesia